ITA Award for Best Director - Comedy is an award given by Indian Television Academy as a part of its annual event.

Winners

References 

Awards for best director
Indian Television Academy Awards
Awards established in 2001